The quantum boomerang effect is a quantum mechanical phenomenon whereby wavepackets launched through disordered media return, on average, to their starting points, as a consequence of Anderson localization and the inherent symmetries of the system. At early times, the initial parity asymmetry of the nonzero momentum leads to asymmetric behavior: nonzero displacement of the wavepackets from their origin. At long times, inherent time-reversal symmetry and the confining effects of Anderson localization lead to correspondingly symmetric behavior: both zero final velocity and zero final displacement.

History
In 1958, Philip W. Anderson introduced the eponymous model of disordered lattices which exhibits localization, the confinement of the electrons' probability distributions within some small volume. In other words, if a wavepacket were dropped into a disordered medium, it would spread out initially but then approach some maximum range. On the macroscopic scale, the transport properties of the lattice are reduced as a result of localization, turning what might have been a conductor into an insulator. Modern condensed matter models continue to study disorder as an important feature of real, imperfect materials.

In 2019, theorists considered the behavior of a wavepacket not merely dropped, but actively launched through a disordered medium with some initial nonzero momentum, predicting that the wavepacket's center of mass would asymptotically return to the origin at long times — the quantum boomerang effect. Shortly after, quantum simulation experiments in cold atom settings confirmed this prediction
by simulating the quantum kicked rotor, a model that maps to the Anderson model of disordered lattices.

Description

Consider a wavepacket  with initial momentum  which evolves in the general Hamiltonian of a Gaussian, uncorrelated, disordered medium:

The classical Boltzmann equation predicts that this wavepacket should slow down and localize at some new point — namely, the terminus of its mean free path. However, when accounting for the quantum mechanical effects of localization and time-reversal symmetry (or some other unitary or antiunitary symmetry), the probability density distribution  exhibits off-diagonal, oscillatory elements in its eigenbasis expansion that decay at long times, leaving behind only diagonal elements independent of the sign of the initial momentum. Since the direction of the launch does not matter at long times, the wavepacket must return to the origin.

The same destructive interference argument used to justify Anderson localization applies to the quantum boomerang. The Ehrenfest theorem states that the variance (i.e. the spread) of the wavepacket evolves thus:

where the use of the Wigner function allows the final approximation of the particle distribution into two populations  of positive and negative velocities, with centers of mass denoted

The same logic does not apply to  because there is no initial population in the momentum state . Thus, the wavepacket variance only has the first term:

This yields long-time behavior

The exact form of the boomerang can be approximated using the diagonal Padé approximants  extracted from a series expansion derived with the Berezinskii diagrammatic technique.

References

Condensed matter physics
Quantum mechanics